Caluga o menta (El Niki) (Candy or Mint) is a 1990 Chilean crime drama directed by Gonzalo Justiniano and one of the country's first post-Pinochet dictatorship films.

Summary 
The film provides an accurate and gritty portrayal of the lives of a group of young people from the marginalized neighborhoods of Santiago. Niki and his friends are unemployed, with nothing to do, and quickly get caught up in the world of drugs and crime. During one of their adventures, Niki meets Manuela, his love interest who is known as "crazy".

Cast
 Hector Vega Mauricio
 Patricia Rivadeneira
 Aldo Parodi
 Myriam Palacios
 David Olguiser
 Rodrigo Gijon
 Cecilia Godoy
 Rodrigo Peña
 Luis Alarcón

References

External links

1990 films
Chilean drama films